This is a list of places in the continent of Asia which have standing links to local communities in other countries. In most cases, the association, especially when formalised by local government, is known as "town twinning" (usually in Europe) or "sister cities" (usually in the rest of the world), and while most of the places included are towns, the list also includes villages, cities, districts, and counties with similar links.

Afghanistan
Asadabad
 Union City, United States

Ghazni

 Hayward, United States
 Nishapur, Iran

Herat

 Council Bluffs, United States
 Nishapur, Iran

Jalalabad
 San Diego, United States

Kabul

 Ankara, Turkey
 Kazan, Russia

Kandahar
 Council Bluffs, United States

Mazar-i-Sharif

 Dushanbe, Tajikistan
 Mashhad, Iran

Armenia

Azerbaijan

Bahrain
Manama

 Ankara, Turkey
 Karachi, Pakistan

Bangladesh

Brunei
Bandar Seri Begawan
 Nanjing, China

Cambodia
Phnom Penh

 Bangkok, Thailand
 Beijing, China
 Busan, South Korea
 Chongqing, China
 Hanoi, Vietnam
 Hefei, China
 Ho Chi Minh City, Vietnam
 Incheon, South Korea
 Kitakyushu, Japan
 Kunming, China
 Long Beach, United States
 Lowell, United States
 Shanghai, China
 Shenzhen, China

Sihanoukville

 Maardu, Estonia
 Nanning, China
 Seattle, United States

China

East Timor
Dili

 Coimbra, Portugal
 Darwin, Australia

Georgia

India

Indonesia

Iran

Iraq

Israel

Japan

Jordan

Kazakhstan
Aktobe

 Karamay, China
 Orenburg, Russia

Almaty

 Alexandria, Egypt
 Bishkek, Kyrgyzstan
 Daegu, South Korea
 Ho Chi Minh City, Vietnam
 Istanbul, Turkey
 Jeddah, Saudi Arabia
 Malatya, Turkey
 Modena, Italy
 Moscow, Russia
 Rennes, France
 Riga, Latvia
 Rosario, Argentina
 Saint Petersburg, Russia
 San José, Costa Rica
 Tashkent, Uzbekistan
 Tel Aviv, Israel
 Tucson, United States
 Ürümqi, China
 Vilnius, Lithuania

Astana

 Amman, Jordan
 Ankara, Turkey
 Ashgabat, Turkmenistan
 Bangkok, Thailand
 Beijing, China
 Bishkek, Kyrgyzstan
 Damascus, Syria
 Gdańsk, Poland
 Hanoi, Vietnam
 Islamabad, Pakistan
 Kazan, Russia
 Kyiv, Ukraine
 Moscow, Russia
 Nice, France
 Oulu, Finland
 Putrajaya, Malaysia
 Riga, Latvia
 Saint Petersburg, Russia
 Seoul, South Korea
 Tashkent, Uzbekistan
 Tbilisi, Georgia
 Ufa, Russia
 Ulaanbaatar, Mongolia
 Uşak, Turkey
 Vilnius, Lithuania
 Warsaw, Poland

Karaganda

 Cluj-Napoca, Romania
 Songpa (Seoul), South Korea

Kokshetau  
 Waukesha, United States

Kostanay
 Kirklees, England, United Kingdom

Kyzylorda

 Arvada, United States
 Bolu, Turkey
 Bursa, Turkey

Oral

 Kostroma, Russia
 Manisa, Turkey
 Orenburg, Russia
 Ostrava, Czech Republic

Oskemen

 Babruysk, Belarus
 Barnaul, Russia
 Tacheng, China

Petropavl
 Omsk, Russia

Shymkent

 Acharnes, Greece
 Baiyin, China
 Khujand, Tajikistan
 Pattaya, Thailand
 Stevenage, England, United Kingdom

Kuwait
Ahmadi
 Ho Chi Minh City, Vietnam

Kuwait City

 Ankara, Turkey
 Florence, Italy
 Gaziantep, Turkey
 Guangzhou, China
 Isfahan, Iran
 Mexico City, Mexico
 Rosario, Argentina
 Sarajevo, Bosnia and Herzegovina
 Tunis, Tunisia

Kyrgyzstan
Bishkek

 Almaty, Kazakhstan
 Ankara, Turkey
 Ashgabat, Turkmenistan
 Astana, Kazakhstan
 Colorado Springs, United States
 Doha, Qatar
 Gumi, South Korea
 İzmir, Turkey
 Kyiv, Ukraine
 Lianyungang, China
 Qazvin, Iran
 Samsun, Turkey
 Shenzhen, China
 Tashkent, Uzbekistan
 Tehran, Iran
 Trabzon, Turkey
 Ufa, Russia
 Ürümqi, China
 Wuhan, China
 Yinchuan, China

Özgön

 Bolu, Turkey
 Yıldırım, Turkey

Laos
Champasak

 Da Nang, Vietnam
 Ho Chi Minh City, Vietnam
 Nanning, China

Luang Prabang
 Chengdu, China

Vientiane

 Beijing, China
 Elgin, United States
 Ho Chi Minh City, Vietnam
 Kunming, China

Lebanon
Beirut

 Aleppo, Syria
 Dubai, United Arab Emirates
 Istanbul, Turkey
 Karachi, Pakistan
 Los Angeles, United States
 Rio de Janeiro, Brazil
 Yerevan, Armenia

Malaysia

Maldives
Malé

 Colombo, Sri Lanka

 Suzhou, China

Mongolia
Darkhan

 Dimitrovgrad, Bulgaria
 Irving, United States
 Kaposvár, Hungary
 Ulan-Ude, Russia
 Zeitz, Germany

Erdenet

 Edremit, Turkey
 Fairbanks, United States
 Székesfehérvár, Hungary
 Ulan-Ude, Russia

Kharkhorin
 Bolu, Turkey

Ulaanbaatar

 Ankara, Turkey
 Astana, Kazakhstan
 Bangkok, Thailand
 Beijing, China
 Bonn, Germany
 Denver, United States
 Elista, Russia
 Gaziantep, Turkey
 Haikou, China
 Hohhot, China
 Incheon, South Korea
 Irkutsk, Russia
 Kazan, Russia
 Krasnoyarsk, Russia
 Maardu, Estonia
 Moscow, Russia
 Novosibirsk, Russia
 Pyongyang, North Korea
 Seoul, South Korea
 Strelcha, Bulgaria
 Taipei, Taiwan
 Tianjin, China
 Ulan-Ude, Russia
 Yinchuan, China

Myanmar
Mandalay
 Kunming, China

Yangon

 Busan, South Korea
 Haikou, China
 Ho Chi Minh City, Vietnam
 Kathmandu, Nepal
 Kunming, China
 Nanning, China
 Quezon City, Philippines
 Yangzhou, China

Nepal
Bharatpur
 Golmud, China

Gorkha
 Rushmoor, England, United Kingdom

Indrawati
 Jersey City, United States

Janakpur
 Ayodhya, India

Kathmandu

 Boulder, United States
 Chengdu, China
 Eugene, United States
 Fredericksburg, United States
 Lhasa, China
 Matsumoto, Japan
 Pyongyang, North Korea
 Rochester, United States
 Varanasi, India
 Xi'an, China
 Yangon, Myanmar

Pokhara

 Guangzhou, China
 Kunming, China
 Nyingchi, China
 Princes' Islands, Turkey

Siddharthanagar
 Baoji, China

North Korea
Chongjin
 Changchun, China

Haeju
 Ulan-Ude, Russia

Hamhung
 Shanghai, China

Kaesong
 Cusco, Peru

Nampo

 Saint Petersburg, Russia
 Weihai, China

Pyongsong
 Pernik, Bulgaria

Pyongyang

 Baghdad, Iraq
 Chiang Mai, Thailand
 Dubai, United Arab Emirates
 Jakarta, Indonesia
 Kathmandu, Nepal
 Moscow, Russia
 Tianjin, China
 Ulaanbaatar, Mongolia

Sariwon
 Lahore, Pakistan

Wonsan

 Puebla, Mexico
 Vladivostok, Russia

Oman
Muscat

 Cairo, Egypt
 Casablanca, Morocco
 Tunis, Tunisia

Pakistan

Palestine

Philippines

Qatar
Doha

 Ankara, Turkey
 Banjul, Gambia
 Beijing, China
 Beit Sahour, Palestine
 Bishkek, Kyrgyzstan
 Charleston, United States
 Libertador (Caracas), Venezuela
 Marbella, Spain
 Mogadishu, Somalia
 Nicosia, Cyprus
 Port Louis, Mauritius
 Quito, Ecuador
 San Salvador, El Salvador
 Sarajevo, Bosnia and Herzegovina
 Sofia, Bulgaria
 Tbilisi, Georgia
 Tirana, Albania
 Tunis, Tunisia

Russia

Saudi Arabia
Jeddah

 Almaty, Kazakhstan
 Baku, Azerbaijan
 Istanbul, Turkey
 Jakarta, Indonesia
 Karachi, Pakistan
 Kuching, Malaysia
 Marbella, Spain
 Oran, Algeria
 Plovdiv, Bulgaria
 Taipei, Taiwan

South Korea

Sri Lanka
Colombo

 Malé, Maldives
 Saint Petersburg, Russia
 Shanghai, China

Galle
 Velsen, Netherlands

Hambantota
 Guangzhou, China

Jaffna

 Kingston upon Thames, England, United Kingdom
 Sterling Heights, United States

Moratuwa
 Suita, Japan

Nuwara Eliya

 Vidnoye, Russia
 Uji, Japan
 Yongzhou, China

Polonnaruwa
 Kunming, China

Syria
Aleppo

 Beirut, Lebanon
 Gaziantep, Turkey
 Kilis, Turkey
 Osmangazi, Turkey

Damascus

 Ankara, Turkey
 Astana, Kazakhstan
 Bucharest, Romania
 Buenos Aires, Argentina
 Córdoba, Spain
 Dubai, United Arab Emirates
 Istanbul, Turkey
 Toledo, Spain
 Yerevan, Armenia

Homs

 Belo Horizonte, Brazil
 Kayseri, Turkey
 Yazd, Iran

Latakia

 Afyonkarahisar, Turkey
 Yalta, Ukraine

Tartus

 Kütahya, Turkey
 Piraeus, Greece
 Tortosa, Spain

Taiwan

Tajikistan
Dushanbe

 Ankara, Turkey
 Ashgabat, Turkmenistan
 Boulder, United States
 Hainan, China
 Klagenfurt, Austria
 Lahore, Pakistan
 Lusaka, Zambia
 Mazar-i-Sharif, Afghanistan
 Minsk, Belarus
 Monastir, Tunisia
 Qingdao, China
 Reutlingen, Germany
 Saint Petersburg, Russia
 Sanaa, Yemen
 Shiraz, Iran
 Tehran, Iran
 Ürümqi, China
 Xiamen, China

Istaravshan
 Krasnoyarsk, Russia

Khujand

 Ağstafa, Azerbaijan
 Lincoln, United States
 Nishapur, Iran
 Samarkand, Uzbekistan
 Orenburg, Russia
 Shymkent, Kazakhstan
 Tabriz, Iran
 Vladimir, Russia

Kulob

 Hamadan, Iran
 Konya, Turkey
 Nishapur, Iran

Thailand

Turkey

Turkmenistan
Ashgabat

 Aktau, Kazakhstan
 Albuquerque, United States
 Ankara, Turkey
 Astana, Kazakhstan
 Athens, Greece
 Bamako, Mali
 Bishkek, Kyrgyzstan
 Dushanbe, Tajikistan
 Kyiv, Ukraine
 Lanzhou, China
 Tashkent, Uzbekistan

Mary

 Istanbul, Turkey
 Oryol, Russia
 Samarkand, Uzbekistan
 Xi'an, China

Türkmenabat
 İzmir, Turkey

United Arab Emirates
Abu Dhabi

 Bethlehem, Palestine
 Brisbane, Australia
 Cairo, Egypt
 Houston, United States
 Madrid, Spain
 Minsk, Belarus

Dubai

 Amman, Jordan
 Beirut, Lebanon
 Busan, South Korea
 Cape Town, South Africa
 Casablanca, Morocco
 Damascus, Syria
 Detroit, United States
 Dundee, Scotland, United Kingdom
 Frankfurt am Main, Germany
 Gaza City, Palestine
 Gold Coast, Australia
 Guangzhou, China
 Istanbul, Turkey
 Kuala Lumpur, Malaysia
 Moscow, Russia
 Pyongyang, North Korea
 San Juan, Puerto Rico
 San Salvador, El Salvador
 Shanghai, China

Uzbekistan
Bukhara

 Bonn, Germany
 Córdoba, Spain
 Hamadan, Iran
 İzmir, Turkey
 Lahore, Pakistan
 Malatya, Turkey
 Nishapur, Iran
 Orekhovo-Zuyevo, Russia
 Rueil-Malmaison, France
 Santa Fe, United States
 Słupsk, Poland
 Vladimir, Russia
 Yıldırım, Turkey

Samarkand

 Balkh, Afghanistan
 Banda Aceh, Indonesia
 Cusco, Peru
 Jūrmala, Latvia
 Kairouan, Tunisia
 Khujand, Tajikistan
 Krasnoyarsk, Russia
 Lahore, Pakistan
 Liège, Belgium
 Mary, Turkmenistan
 Merv, Turkmenistan
 Mexico City, Mexico
 New Delhi, India
 Nishapur, Iran
 Plovdiv, Bulgaria
 Rio de Janeiro, Brazil
 Samara, Russia
 Xi'an, China

Tashkent

 Almaty, Kazakhstan
 Ankara, Turkey
 Ashgabat, Turkmenistan
 Astana, Kazakhstan
 Berlin, Germany
 Bishkek, Kyrgyzstan
 Cairo, Egypt
 Dnipro, Ukraine
 Karachi, Pakistan
 Kyiv, Ukraine
 Moscow, Russia
 Riga, Latvia
 Seattle, United States 
 Seoul, South Korea
 Shanghai, China
 Sverdlovsk, Ukraine

Vietnam

Yemen
Aden
 Shanghai, China

Sanaa

 Ankara, Turkey
 Cairo, Egypt
 Dushanbe, Tajikistan
 Tehran, Iran

References